Shono (lit. Listen) is a Bengali-language pop album by Habib Wahid released on November 9, 2006. It is Habib Wahid's first solo album, and fourth studio album overall. The album has 9 tracks in total, which were all composed and produced by Habib Wahid. Habib also served as the main vocalist for album, singing every song except for "Calenderer Pata", which is sung by his father Ferdous Wahid. The album features a wide range of genres such as world, pop, EDM, and more.

Release 
The album was originally released on January 1, 2006, through CDs. The album was later released on digital stores and for digital streaming on different platforms like iTunes, Apple Music and GP Music.

Reception 
Like Habib Wahid's other albums, Shono gained immense popularity among audiences.

Track listing

References 

2006 albums
Habib Wahid albums
Laser Vision albums